Lissochroa is a genus of moths of the family Yponomeutidae.

Species
Lissochroa argostola - Turner, 1923 

Yponomeutidae